The 2018 National Women's Football Championship was the 11th season of the National Women Football Championship, the top-tier of women's football in Pakistan.

Pakistan Army won their maiden title after beating WAPDA 3-0 on penalties after the match had ended 1-1 at the Punjab Stadium.

Teams
This edition was the first one to be held since 2014, and 14 teams were selected for the competition:

 Balochistan United
 Diya
 Gilgit-Baltistan FA
 Islamabad
 Karachi Kickers
 Karachi United
 Karachi
 Khyber Pakhtunkhwa
 Model Town
 Pakistan Army
 Punjab
 Royal Eagles
 WAPDA
 Young Rising Stars

References

National Women Football Championship seasons
W1
Pakistan
Pakistan

2018 in Pakistani women's sport